Madeley Junction may refer to two locations on the British railway system:

 Madeley Junction, Shropshire, between Wolverhampton and Shrewsbury
 Madeley Junction, Staffordshire, between Stafford and Crewe